In enzymology, a 4-hydroxyphenylacetaldehyde oxime monooxygenase is an enzyme that catalyzes the chemical reaction

(Z)-4-hydroxyphenylacetaldehyde oxime + NADPH + H+ + O2  (S)-4-hydroxymandelonitrile + NADP+ + 2 H2O

The 4 substrates of this enzyme are (Z)-4-hydroxyphenylacetaldehyde oxime, NADPH, H+, and O2, whereas its 3 products are (S)-4-hydroxymandelonitrile, NADP+, and H2O.

This enzyme belongs to the family of oxidoreductases, specifically those acting on paired donors, with O2 as oxidant and incorporation or reduction of oxygen. The oxygen incorporated need not be derived from O2 with NADH or NADPH as one donor, and incorporation of one atom o oxygen into the other donor.  The systematic name of this enzyme class is (Z)-4-hydroxyphenylacetaldehyde oxime,NADPH:oxygen oxidoreductase. Other names in common use include 4-hydroxybenzeneacetaldehyde oxime monooxygenase, cytochrome P450II-dependent monooxygenase, NADPH-cytochrome P450 reductase (CYP71E1), CYP71E1, and 4-hydroxyphenylacetaldehyde oxime,NADPH:oxygen oxidoreductase.  This enzyme participates in tyrosine metabolism.

References

 
 
 
 

EC 1.14.13
NADPH-dependent enzymes
Enzymes of unknown structure